The Routh array is a tabular method permitting one to establish the stability of a system using only the coefficients of the characteristic polynomial.  Central to the field of control systems design, the Routh–Hurwitz theorem and Routh array emerge by using the Euclidean algorithm and Sturm's theorem in evaluating Cauchy indices.

The Cauchy index 
Given the system:
 
Assuming no roots of  lie on the imaginary axis, and letting
then we have
 
Expressing  in polar form, we have
 
where
 
and 
 
from (2) note that
 
where
 
Now if the ith root of  has a positive real part, then (using the notation y=(RE[y],IM[y]))
  
and
 
and
 
Similarly, if the ith root of  has a negative real part,
  
and
 
and
 
From (9) to (11) we find that  when the ith root of  has a positive real part, and from (12) to (14) we find that  when the ith root of  has a negative real part.  Thus,
 
So, if we define
 
then we have the relationship

and combining (3) and (17) gives us
  and 

In the case where the starting point is on an incongruity (i.e.
 
over said interval when our starting point is at an incongruity.

The Routh criterion 
To derive Routh's criterion, first we'll use a different notation to differentiate between the even and odd terms of :
 
Now we have: 
 
Therefore, if  is even, 

and if  is odd:
 
Now observe that if  is an odd integer, then by (3)  is odd. If  is an odd integer, then  is odd as well. Similarly, this same argument shows that when  is even,  will be even. Therefore,  is defined for  even, and is thus the proper index to use when n is even, and similarly  is defined for  odd, making it the proper index in this latter case.

Thus, from (6) and (23), for  even:
 
and from (19) and (24), for  odd:

Lo and behold we are evaluating the same Cauchy index for both:

Sturm's theorem 
Sturm gives us a method for evaluating .  His theorem states as follows:

Given a sequence of polynomials  where:

2)    for 

 
A sequence satisfying these requirements is obtained using the Euclidean algorithm, which is as follows:

or in general 
 
It can be observed that the sequence so constructed will satisfy the conditions of Sturm's theorem, and thus an algorithm for determining the stated index has been developed.

It is in applying Sturm's theorem (28) to (29), through the use of the Euclidean algorithm above that the Routh matrix is formed.

We get

where

Continuing with the Euclidean algorithm on these new coefficients gives us

making our formed remainder 

and giving us

The rows of the Routh array are determined exactly by this algorithm when applied to the coefficients of (20).  An observation worthy of note is that in the regular case the polynomials  and  have as the highest common factor  and thus there will be  polynomials in the chain .

The number of roots of a real polynomial  which lie in the right half plane  is equal to the number of changes of sign in the first column of the Routh scheme.

In order for all the roots of the polynomial  to have negative real parts, it is necessary and sufficient that all of the elements in the first column of the Routh scheme be different from zero and of the same sign.

References
Hurwitz, A., "On the Conditions under which an Equation has only Roots with Negative Real Parts", Rpt. in Selected Papers on Mathematical Trends in Control Theory, Ed. R. T. Ballman et al.  New York: Dover 1964
Routh, E. J., A Treatise on the Stability of a Given State of Motion.  London: Macmillan, 1877.  Rpt. in Stability of Motion, Ed. A. T. Fuller.  London: Taylor & Francis, 1975
Felix Gantmacher (J.L. Brenner translator) (1959) Applications of the Theory of Matrices, pp 177–80, New York: Interscience.

Article proofs
Control theory
Signal processing
Polynomials